The Play-offs of the 2012 Fed Cup Asia/Oceania Zone Group II were the final stages of the Group II Zonal Competition involving teams from Asia and Oceania. Using the positions determined in their pools, the ten teams faced off to determine their placing in the 2012 Fed Cup Asia/Oceania Zone Group II. The top team advanced to 2013 Asia/Oceania Zone Group I.

Promotional Round
The first placed teams of each pool played in a head-to-head round. The winner advanced to the Group I for 2013.

Hong Kong vs. India

3rd to 4th play-off
The second placed teams of each pool played in a head-to-head round to find the third and fourth placed teams.

Kyrgyzstan vs. Philippines

5th to 6th play-off
The third placed teams of each pool played in a head-to-head round to find the fifth and sixth placed teams.

Singapore vs. Turkmenistan

7th to 8th play-off
The fourth placed teams of each pool played in a head-to-head round to find the seventh and eighth placed teams.

Pakistan vs. Oman

9th to 10th play-off
The fifth placed teams of each pool played in a head-to-head round to find the ninth and tenth placed teams.

Sri Lanka vs. Iran

Final Placements

  advanced to the Fed Cup Asia/Oceania Zone Group I for 2013.

See also
Fed Cup structure

References

External links
 Fed Cup website

2012 Fed Cup Asia/Oceania Zone